Der Bazar was a fashion magazine which was published in Berlin, German Empire, in the period 1854–1933. Its subtitle was first . It is one of the earliest examples of a multilingual magazine.

History and profile
Der Bazar was launched on 10 December 1854 as a biweekly magazine and was based in Berlin. Its publisher was owned by Louis Schäfer. However, it was Antonie von Cosmar who suggested establishing Der Bazar. She was a playwright and novelist. From 1857 the magazine was redesigned, and its subtitle was modified, and the frequency was switched to weekly. Der Bazar folded in 1933.

Content
The magazine covered fashion-related news and illustrations, as well as suggestions to retailers on methods of selling clothes to women. Der Bazar featured illustrations of ballroom outfits as clothing advice to its readers in its first January issue every year. The magazine also published articles on cosmopolitan lifestyles, home life and aesthetics.

Editions and circulation
Der Bazar enjoyed international readership and had editions in other languages. By 1863, in addition to 105,000 copies in German annually, it sold 50,000 copies in English, 32,000 in French and 15,000 in Spanish. The magazine also published editions in Dutch, Russian, Italian, Hungarian and Czech, and claimed to be the most widespread journal in the world with a circulation of over half a million. By 1891 it was the best-selling women’s fashion and home magazine in Germany, targeting primarily middle to upper class women.

Der Bazar had many spin-offs and inspired many women's magazines. A notable example was the American fashion magazine Harper's Bazaar, which employed some of the content of Der Bazar following its foundation in 1867. Another magazine inspired from Der Bazar which republished its fashion content was Magyar Bazár, a Hungarian fashion magazine based in Budapest.

References

External links

1854 establishments in Germany
1933 disestablishments in Germany
Biweekly magazines published in Germany
Defunct magazines published in Germany
German-language magazines
Magazines established in 1854
Magazines disestablished in 1933
Magazines published in Berlin
Multilingual magazines
Weekly magazines published in Germany
Women's magazines published in Germany
Women's fashion magazines